The 2019–20 National League season, known as the Vanarama National League for sponsorship reasons, was the fifth season under English football's new title of National League, the sixteenth season consisting of three divisions, and the forty-first season overall.

As a result of the COVID-19 pandemic, the National League season was initially suspended on 16 March 2020 until at least 3 April. On 31 March, this suspension was extended indefinitely until further notice. On 22 April, clubs voted to end the season, with promotions and relegations still "under careful consideration". Due to the knock-on effects of Bury F.C.'s expulsion from EFL League One at the start of the season, it had already been assumed prior to the pandemic that no more than one club instead of the usual two was to be relegated from the English Football League, and that no more than three clubs instead of the usual four were to be relegated from the National division. The cumulative effect that the early termination of the season and Bury's expulsion from the EFL had on the composition of the National League's three divisions would have been determined.

On 17 June 2020, Barrow along with Wealdstone and King's Lynn Town were elected champions of their respective divisions after National League clubs voted to decide the final tables on a points-per-game basis. Barrow were therefore promoted to League Two, with Wealdstone and King's Lynn Town promoted to the National League. AFC Fylde considered mounting a legal challenge with support from Ebbsfleet United against their relegations, but ultimately decided against it.

Promotion play-offs were held in all three divisions to decide the additional promotion places. The semi-finals took place over the final two weekends of July, and the finals took place on 1 and 2 August. Clubs were expected to conduct and fund a COVID-19 prevention and testing process, and were allowed to decline their place in the competition without penalty if they were unable to fulfil this requirement. On 1 July, the Premier League committed £200,000 to the National League to help fund the conclusion of their season.

National League

The National League consists of 24 clubs.

Promotion and relegation

Team changes

To National League
Promoted from 2018–19 National League North
 Stockport County
 Chorley

Promoted from 2018–19 National League South
 Torquay United
 Woking

Relegated from 2018–19 League Two
 Yeovil Town
 Notts County

From National League
Promoted to 2019–20 League Two
 Leyton Orient
 Salford City

Relegated to 2019–20 National League North
 Gateshead

Relegated to 2019–20 National League South
 Maidstone United
 Braintree Town
 Havant & Waterlooville

Stadia and locations

Personnel and sponsoring

Managerial changes

National League table

Play-offs

Quarter-finals

Semi-finals

Final

Results table

Top scorers

Monthly awards

Each month the Motorama National League announces their official Player of the Month and Manager of the Month.

National League North

The National League North consists of 22 teams.

Team changes

To National League North
Promoted from 2018–19 Northern Premier League Premier Division
 Farsley Celtic

Promoted from 2018–19 Southern League Premier Division Central
 Kettering Town
 King's Lynn Town

Relegated from 2018–19 National League
 Gateshead

Transferred from 2018–19 National League South
 Gloucester City

From National League North
Promoted to 2019–20 National League
 Stockport County
 Chorley

Relegated to 2019–20 Northern Premier League Premier Division
 Ashton United
 F.C. United of Manchester

Relegated to 2019–20 Southern League Premier Division Central
 Nuneaton Borough

Stadia and locations

National League North table

Play-offs

Quarter-finals

Semi-finals

Final

Results

Managerial changes

Top scorers

Monthly Awards

Each month the Motorama National League announces their official Player of the Month and Manager of the Month.

National League South

The National League South consists of 22 teams.

Team changes

To National League South
Promoted from 2018–19 Isthmian League Premier Division
 Dorking Wanderers
 Tonbridge Angels

Promoted from 2018–19 Southern League Premier Division South
 Weymouth

Relegated from 2018–19 National League
 Braintree Town
 Havant & Waterlooville
 Maidstone United

From National League South
Promoted to 2019–20 National League
 Torquay United
 Woking

Relegated to 2019–20 Isthmian League Premier Division
 East Thurrock United

Relegated to 2019–20 Southern League Premier Division South
 Truro City
 Weston-super-Mare

Transferred to 2019–20 National League North
 Gloucester City

Stadia and locations

National League South table

Play-offs

Quarter-final

Semi-finals

Final

Results table

Managerial changes

Notes

References

 
National League (English football) seasons
5
Eng
Eng
England